Midlands 2 West (South) is a level seven English rugby union league and level two of the Midlands League, made up of teams from the southern part of the West Midlands region including Herefordshire, parts of Birmingham and the West Midlands, Warwickshire and Worcestershire, with home and away matches played throughout the season.  When this division began in 1992 it was known as Midlands West 1, until it was split into two regional divisions called Midlands 3 West (North) and Midlands 3 West (South) ahead of the 2000–01 season.  Further restructuring of the Midlands leagues ahead of the 2009–10 season, lead to the current name of Midlands 2 West (South).

Promoted teams usually move up to Midlands 1 West with the league champions going up automatically and the runner-up in a play-off against the runner-up from Midlands 2 West (North) for the third promotion place. Relegated teams usually drop to Midlands 3 West (South).  Each year all clubs in the division also take part in the RFU Intermediate Cup - a level 7 national competition.

2021-22

2020–21
Due to the COVID-19 pandemic, the 2020–21 season was cancelled.

2019–20

2018–19

2017–18

2016–17

Barkers Butts
Berkswell & Balsall
Dunlop
Earlsdon
Leamington
Malvern
Nuneaton Old Edwardians
Pinley
Rugby Lions (promoted from Midlands 3 West (South))
Silhillians (relegated from Midlands 1 West)
Southam (promoted from Midlands 3 West (South))
Spartans (Midlands)

2015–16

Banbury 
Barkers Butts (relegated from Midlands 1 West)
Bedworth (promoted from Midlands 3 West (South))
Berkswell & Balsall (relegated from Midlands 1 West)
Droitwich
Dunlop (promoted from Midlands 3 West (South))
Earlsdon (relegated from Midlands 1 West)
Leamington
Malvern 
Nuneaton Old Edwardians
Pilney
Spartans (Midlands)

2014–15

Banbury 
Droitwich
Leamington
Malvern (relegated from Midlands 1 West)
Newbold on Avon	
Nuneaton Old Edwardians
Old Coventrians	
Old Laurentians (relegated from Midlands 1 West)	
Old Leamingtonians	
Old Yardleians (promoted from Midlands 3 West (South))
Pilney(promoted from Midlands 3 West (South))
Spartans (Midlands)

2013–14

Banbury
Bedworth
Droitwich
Dunlop
Earlsdon
Kidderminster
Leamington
Nuneaton Old Edwardians
Old Coventrians (promoted from Midlands 3 West (South))
Old Leamingtonians (promoted from Midlands 3 West (South))
Spartans (Midlands)
Stourbridge Lions

2012–13

Banbury
Bedworth
Droitwich
Dunlop
Earlsdon
Kenilworth (relegated from Midlands 1 West)
Kidderminster
Leamington
Newbold-on-Avon
Old Laurentians	
Shipton-on-Stour
Upton-on-Severn

2011–12

Banbury
Barkers Butts
Barkswell & Balsall
Cheltenham North
Droitwich
Kidderminster Carolians
Leamington
Newbold-on-Avon
Old Laurentians
Pershore
Silhillians
Upton on Severn

2008–09

Barkers Butts 
Berkswell & Balsall
Droitwich
Earlsdon 
Kidderminster Carolians
Leamington
Newbold-on-Avon  
Nuneaton Old Edwardians
Old Coventrians
Old Laurentians
Silhillians
Spartans

Original teams

Teams in Midlands 2 West (North) and Midlands 2 West (South) were originally part of a single division called Midlands 1 West, which contained the following sides when in was introduced in 1992:

Bromsgrove - relegated from Midlands 2 West (11th)
Dudley Kingswinford - promoted from North Midlands 1 (runners up)
Kings Norton - promoted from North Midlands 1 (4th)
Leek - promoted from Staffordshire/Warwickshire 1 (4th)
Ludlow - promoted from North Midlands 1 (5th)
Newbold-on-Avon - relegated from Midlands 2 West (9th)
Newcastle (Staffs) - promoted from Staffordshire/Warwickshire 1 (runners up)
Old Halesonians - promoted from North Midlands 1 (3rd)
Old Leamingtonians - promoted from Staffordshire/Warwickshire 1 (5th)
Old Longtonians - promoted from Staffordshire/Warwickshire 1 (champions)
Old Yardleians - promoted from North Midlands 1 (champions)
Sutton Coldfield - relegated from Midlands 2 West (10th)
Willenhall - promoted from Staffordshire/Warwickshire 1 (3rd)

Midlands 2 West (South) honours

Midlands West 1 (1992–1993)

Midlands 2 West (North) and Midlands 2 West (South) were originally part of a single tier 7 division called Midlands West 1.  Promotion was to Midlands 2 and relegation to Midlands West 2.

Midlands West 1 (1993–1996)

The top six teams from Midlands 1 and the top six from North 1 were combined to create National 5 North, meaning that Midlands 1 West dropped to become a tier 8 league.  Promotion and relegation continued to Midlands 2 and  Midlands West 2.

Midlands West 1 (1996–2000)

At the end of the 1995–96 season National 5 North was discontinued and Midlands West 1 returned to being a tier 7 league.  Promotion and relegation continued to Midlands 2 and  Midlands West 2.

Midlands 3 West (South) (2000–2009)

Restructuring ahead of the 2000–01 season saw Midlands West 1 split  into two tier 7 regional leagues - Midlands 3 West (North) and Midlands 3 West (South).  Promotion was now to Midlands 2 West (formerly Midlands 2) and relegation to Midlands 4 West (South) (formerly Midlands West 2).

Midlands 2 West (South) (2009–present)

League restructuring by the RFU meant that Midlands 3 West (North) and Midlands 3 West (South) were renamed as Midlands 2 West (North) and Midlands 2 West (South), with both leagues remaining at tier 7.  Promotion was now to Midlands 1 West (formerly Midlands 2 West) and relegation to Midlands 3 West (South) (formerly Midlands 4 West (South)).

Promotion play-offs
Since the 2000–01 season there has been a play-off between the runners-up of Midlands 2 West (North) and Midlands 2 West (South) for the third and final promotion place to Midlands 1 West (asides from 2008-09 which was played between the runners up of Midlands 2 West (South) and Midlands 2 East (North) due to RFU restructuring). The team with the superior league record has home advantage in the tie.  At the end of the 2019–20 season the Midlands 2 West (South) teams had ten wins to Midlands 2 West (North) teams eight; and the home team has won promotion on eleven occasions compared to the away teams seven.

2008-09 promotion play-offs 

As mentioned above the 2008-09 promotion playoffs in Midlands 3 were different due to RFU restructuring for the following season.  The two runners up with the worst league records in the four regional divisions at this level would have to face each other for the final promotion spot, with the team with the superior league record having home advantage.

Number of league titles

Barkers Butts (2)
Kenilworth (2)
Leamington (2)
Newbold-on-Avon (2)
Stratford-upon-Avon (2)
Sutton Coldfield (2)
Banbury (1)
Droitwich (1)
Dunlop (1)
Earlsdon (1)
Hereford (1)
Longton (1)
Luctonians (1)
Malvern (1)
Newport (Salop) (1)
Nuneaton Old Edwardians (1)
Old Coventrians (1)
Rugby Lions (1)
Selly Oak (1)
Solihull (1)
Willenhall (1)
Worcester Wanderers (1)

Notes

See also
 Midlands RFU
 North Midlands RFU
 Warwickshire RFU
 English rugby union system
 Rugby union in England

References

Rugby First: To view previous seasons in the league, search for any club within that league then click on to club details followed by fixtures and then select the appropriate season.

7
3